Yoo Kwang-joon (born 7 March 1932) is a South Korean former footballer.

References

External links
 

1932 births
Living people
South Korean footballers
South Korea international footballers
Footballers from Seoul
Association football midfielders